This is a list of newspapers in Tennessee, United States.

Daily and nondaily newspapers

Defunct

See also
 Tennessee media
 List of radio stations in Tennessee
 List of television stations in Tennessee
 Media of cities in Tennessee: Chattanooga, Knoxville, Memphis, Murfreesboro, Nashville
 Journalism:
 :Category:Journalists from Tennessee
 University of Memphis Department of Journalism
 Southern Adventist University School of Journalism and Communication, in Collegedale 
 Tennessee literature

References

Bibliography
  (+ List of titles 50+ years old)
 
 
 
 
 
  (Includes information about weekly rural newspapers in Tennessee)
  (Includes information about newspapers)
 Jack Mooney, ed., A History of Tennessee Newspapers (1996)

External links

 . (Survey of local news existence and ownership in 21st century)
  (Includes information about newspapers)
  (Directory ceased in 2017)
 . (Digitized issues)
 . (Searchable by locale)
 
 
 
 
  (Includes Tennessee newspapers) 
 
 
 
 
 

Tennessee